Rosa Merino (1790–1868) is a Peruvian soprano singer of the late 18th century. She is considered to be the first singer the National Anthem of Peru and one of the first patriot women of Peru.

Biography 
Rosa Merino was born in Lima, the capital of Peru, in 1790.

She became famous in 1812, but until then Merino she performed in the record company of Andres Bolognesi. She took parts in the opera La Isabela.

Afterward, Rosa Merino became very popular among contemporary Peruvian people with the patriotic song La Chicha, which was unofficially considered the first Peruvian national anthem. After a contest, that was sponsored by General Jose de San Martin, Rosa Merino was chosen to sing the "National Anthem of Peru" for the first time on 23 September 1821.

In the last fifteen years of her life she continued to perform for charity evenings and lyrical events. She is considered to be one of the first patriot women of Peru.

References 

19th-century Peruvian women singers
19th-century Peruvian singers

1790 births
1868 deaths